António Carlos Marques Antunes (6 February 1962, Lisbon) is a Portuguese chess player. He earned the grandmaster (GM) title in 1994 and International Master (IM) title in 1985. He is the first GM of Portugal. He retired from competitive chess in 2000.

Amongst players he ranks, as of 2022, 969th best of all time and second-best Portuguese chess player ever.

Notable Tournaments

References 

Living people
1962 births
20th-century chess players
Portuguese chess players
Sportspeople from Lisbon
Chess grandmasters